The Butler Bulldogs baseball team represents Butler University in NCAA Division I college baseball. The Bulldogs play their home games at Bulldog Park.

History

The Bulldogs first fielded a varsity baseball team in 1901. They began competition in the Big East Conference in 2014, as they left the Atlantic 10 Conference following the 2013 season. Before 2013, Butler competed in the Horizon League and the MCC.

Notable alumni 
 Oral Hildebrand - Major League player, 1931–1940
 Dan Johnson - Major League player, 2005–2015 
 Pat Neshek - Major League player, 2006–2019

Head coaches

Source: Butler Baseball Record Book

See also
List of NCAA Division I baseball programs

References

External links
 Official Website